Albert Edward Newton (c.1910 – 1989) was an Australian lawn bowls international who competed in the 1950 British Empire Games.

Bowls career
At the 1950 British Empire Games he won the silver medal in the singles event.  

He was the 1952 Australian National Bowls Championships singles winner, bowling for the City Bowls Club in New South Wales.

Newton's brother, Bill, was also a bowler. The siblings competed against each other in the 1957 Australian bowls singles championship, with Albert beating his brother 31-20.

Newton died in 1989.

References

Year of birth uncertain
1989 deaths
Australian male bowls players
Bowls players at the 1950 British Empire Games
Commonwealth Games silver medallists for Australia
Commonwealth Games medallists in lawn bowls
20th-century Australian people
Medallists at the 1950 British Empire Games